John Morrow Robb (July 4, 1876 – December 11, 1942) was a physician and political figure in Ontario. He represented Algoma in the Legislative Assembly of Ontario from 1916 to 1919 and from 1926 to 1934 as a Conservative member.

Background
The son of Samuel Robb and Margaret Morrow, he was born in Downie Township, Perth County. Robb was educated in Stratford and at the University of Toronto. He taught school for three years in Middlesex County. In 1909, Robb married Olive R. Kidd. He served on the school board for Blind River and was Medical Officer of Health for over 20 years.

Politics
Robb was defeated when he ran for reelection to the assembly in 1919 and 1923. He served as Minister of Health from 1930 to 1934 and as Ministry of Labour in 1934. He built a hospital in Blind River which he turned over to the Canadian Red Cross after he was named Minister of Health. Robb died in Blind River at the age of 65.

Cabinet positions

References

External links

1876 births
1942 deaths
Physicians from Ontario
Members of the Executive Council of Ontario
Progressive Conservative Party of Ontario MPPs
People from Perth County, Ontario
University of Toronto alumni